Jonathan Erlich and Andy Ram were the defending champions, but they lost to Pablo Andújar and Leonardo Mayer in the semifinals.
Santiago González and Scott Lipsky won the title, defeating Andújar and Mayer 6–3, 4–6, [10–2] in the final.

Seeds

Draw

Draw

References
 Main Draw

Winston-Salem Open - Doubles
2012 Doubles
Winston-Salem Open - Doubles